Hüti  is a village in Rõuge Parish, Võru County in southeastern Estonia. Between 1991–2017 (until the administrative reform of Estonian municipalities) the village was located in Mõniste Parish. As of 2011 Census, the settlement's population was 27.

References

Villages in Võru County